David Cain is a supervillain in the . He first appeared in Batman #567 (July 1999), and was created by Kelley Puckett and Damion Scott.

Fictional character biography

The assassin
David Cain is one of the world's premier assassins, whose victims have included some of the most famous and powerful people on the planet. He trained the young Bruce Wayne with some of the skills that he would use as Batman, although Bruce has never used some of the more lethal techniques Cain taught him and has since surpassed his teacher in ability. Regarding his decision to train with an assassin, Batman explained, "Knowing how to kill doesn't mean you must kill".

Cain desired a perfect partner with whom to carry out his assassination plans. Attempts to train young children resulted in failure, so he decided to conceive one himself. He found the perfect mother in a martial artist named Sandra Wu-San. He watched her duel her sister at a tournament and concluded that it was her sister Carolyn that was holding Sandra back from her full potential. He murdered Carolyn and ambushed Sandra with the help of Ra's al Ghul and his League of Assassins. In exchange for sparing her life, Sandra agreed to bear David's child and leave the child in his care for him to train.

The child, Cassandra, would be Cain's "One Who Is All", whose native tongue was one-on-one combat. This gave her the ability to read people's intentions simply by their body language. The latter was a special gift that only the Wu-San sisters and Cassandra knew. After bearing his child, Sandra set out to become Lady Shiva.

The father
Cain trained Cassandra in every imaginable form of violence, from hand-to-hand combat to weapons and explosives. Cain never taught her to read or write, and even avoided speaking in her presence; her only language was her ability to read people and predict what her opponents were going to do. His training methods were tantamount to child abuse. When she was 8 years old, Cain took her to kill a businessman. After she did, she "read" him as he died, she saw death as the man saw it, commenting: "Terror and then... nothing". It was this reading that made her decide that murder was wrong and she ran away from Cain, Cain musing in hindsight that he simply pushed her too far too young.

Cain was first introduced into the Batman universe in the No Man's Land (1999) comic book arc. Two-Face hires him to assassinate James Gordon. Cassandra spots him and saves Gordon's life. After she has burned Two-Face's money to void the contract and refuses to come back to him, Cain leaves Gotham, briefly tearful at hearing his daughter's first word ("Stop"). In Cassandra's Batgirl book, Cain is shown to be depressed and alcoholic, constantly rewatching old tapes of Cassandra's training. He later broadcasts a video into the Batcave that reveals what Cassandra had done years ago, but Batman continues to trust her when she deliberately charges towards an armed opponent to save an innocent man, explaining that her reason for doing so was instinct.

Framing Bruce Wayne
Lex Luthor hired Cain to frame Bruce Wayne for the murder of Vesper Fairchild, however Cain had an ulterior motive; determining whether or not Batman was worthy enough of raising Cassandra. Having realised that Bruce was Batman, Cain not only framed Bruce Wayne for Vesper's murder, but planted a complex sequence of evidence to suggest that Wayne killed her because she had deduced Batman's true identity, infiltrating the Batcave and doctoring and then erasing Vesper's electronic journal in such a manner that only the Bat-family could determine what he had done. Although Batman briefly flees with the intention of abandoning his life as Bruce Wayne, a series of events force him to recognise the importance of his civilian life, while Cassandra determines that Cain was responsible after examination of Vesper's corpse reveals that she was first immobilised with a nerve strike Cain taught her and Bruce. Luring Cain into a confrontation near the end of the story arc, Cain concludes that Batman is indeed worthy and turns himself in to clear Wayne's name.

Luthor hires Deadshot to kill Cain while he is in jail due to a fear of him implicating Luthor in Fairchild's murder. Cain has a death wish and almost allows himself to be killed before being reminded of Cassandra. He then fights back and shoots Deadshot repeatedly, intentionally leaving him alive to prove a point. Cassandra visits Cain while in jail and attacks him, threatening to kill him if he ever commits another murder. Cain was proud of this and told Cassandra the date of her birthday and said that "My little girl... all grown up". Later, he escaped from prison undetected to give Cassandra a birthday present before returning.

Truth and consequences
Cassandra recently became curious as to the identity of her birth mother, believing it to be Lady Shiva. When she visited Cain in prison, he refused to tell her. Cassandra eventually confirmed her suspicions when she met Lady Shiva herself. As a result, Cassandra also quit being the super heroine Batgirl.

One Year Later

Following the One Year Later continuity jump, Robin captures Cain and brings him to the League of Assassins as ransom to save Cassandra, only to find that Cassandra is their leader. Cassandra explains that she chose to join the League because she found that Cain had trained other children in addition to her. Her actions were later explained to be the result of Deathstroke injecting her with a mind-altering serum. After her speech, Cassandra handed Robin a gun to kill David, offering him a place in her League. When he refused, she shot her father herself. Cain tells Robin that there were other girls in addition to Cassandra and Annalea before apparently dying. Afterwards, Robin and Cassandra fight. The battle ends when an explosion causes a fire to break out. By the time Robin returns to where he had left Cain's body, it is gone and the assassins' necks are broken.

Batgirl
In the 2008 Batgirl mini-series, it is revealed that Deathstroke had given Cassandra the gun she used to shoot Cain, which was not fatal. After Tim and Cassandra started fighting, Deathstroke got up and killed the ninjas himself. He hoped to open up an "assassination shop" with Cassandra as his second-in-command, using a drug that would turn his army into metahumans. He disappears when Cassandra murders the businessman who was providing that drug. Cain then plots with Slade to "cripple the meta-hero community". Cassandra, who used listening devices to overhear, believes that Oracle is the target of this plot and races to Platinum Heights, Oracle's base of operations, to rescue her. Cassandra locates her father on a rooftop and engages in one-on-one combat. He slides over an edge and is hanging by one hand. Cassandra contemplates whether to save him or not; when he falls, she attempts to grab him. She sees that he only fell a few feet to a ledge below, where he is arrested by Batman, who had followed Cassandra there.

The New 52

David Cain appeared in The New 52 as an assassin working for the villain named "Mother" in Batman and Robin Eternal. David Cain is one of the world's premier assassins, paid to eliminate some of the most famous and powerful people on the planet, no matter how seemingly impossible the task. In this continuity, David is known by the assassin name "Orphan" and raises his daughter Cassandra in a very similar way as portrayed in the Pre-Flashpoint continuity. He brings Cassandra up in an extremely isolated environment. She was trained in all manner of hand-to-hand combat and effectively reading body-language, making her able to predict and anticipate her opponent's attacks. Much like before The New 52, he refrained from showing her any love or affection as a father, not even teaching her how to speak in full sentences. He raised her this way at the behest of Mother, who believes that the perfect assassin could only be molded from exposure to a traumatic existence from a very young age. In DC Rebirth, it is revealed that David fathered the child with Lady Shiva, an assassin for the League of Shadows.

References

Characters created by Kelley Puckett
Characters created by Damion Scott
Comics characters introduced in 1999
DC Comics martial artists
DC Comics male supervillains
DC Comics supervillains
Fictional assassins in comics
Fictional martial arts trainers
Fictional murderers
Batman characters